Limakadeh (also Romanized as Līmākadeh and Līmāk Deh) is a village in Jennat Rudbar Rural District, in the Central District of Ramsar County, Mazandaran Province, Iran. At the 2006 census, its population was 20, in 10 families.

References 

Populated places in Ramsar County